Kumbasaram: The Confession is a 2015 Malayalam thriller film written and directed by Aneesh Anwar, starring Jayasurya, Honey Rose, Vineeth and Priyanka. The film features music composed by Vishnu Mohan Sithara. The music label was Muzik247. The film deals with the unexpected tragedies that befall the family of an autorickshaw driver. The movie is an unofficial remake of Serbian film Klopka with few little changes. It released on 22 May 2015.

Plot
The movie begins with the confessions of Alby, an autorickshaw driver. He was leading a happy life with his wife Meera and their only son Jerry. Alby and Meera are extremely attached with Jerry and dream about his great future. But despite the expectations, Jerry falls critically ill; thus turning Alby and Meera's life upside down.

Cast
Jayasurya as Alby
Honey Rose as Meera
Aakash Santhosh as Jerry
Vineeth as Rafi
Shanavas as Paul Varghese/Abdulla
Priyanka Nair as Ayisha
Tini Tom as Producer Pattabhiraman
Gourav Menon as Rasool
 Asha Aravind as School Teacher
 Lishoy as Doctor Prabhakaran
 Jayakrishnan as Meera's brother
Gauri  as Malu, Jerry's friend

Music

Composer Mohan Sithara's son and young music director Vishnu Mohan Sithara scored the music for the film. Vishnu, had debuted into music by singing in Aneesh's previous film Zachariyayude Garbhinikal.

Reception
The Times of India gave a positive review, stating "Jayasurya and Honey Rose succeed in taking the viewers through their emotional upheaval and child actors do not disappoint. The film connects the missing dots at key points to keep them engaged. Though it unfolds at its own pace and tests the viewers' patience at times, Kumbasaram does have its moments."

Filmibeat.com also gave a positive review with a rating of 3/5, stating the films as "A perfect emotional thriller which impresses with a brilliant story, narrative and amazing performances by the actors."

References

External links
 

2010s Malayalam-language films
Indian remakes of foreign films